Dreib (Arabic: الدريب) is an area that gathers Lebanese villages in Akkar District in Akkar Governorate.

Villages

 Aamaret El Baykat
 Aaouainat
 Ain Ez Zayt
 Ain Tinta
 Al-Furaydis
 Al-Qoubaiyat
 Andaket
 Aydamun
 Berbara
 Bireh
 Chadra
 Charbila
 Cheikh Aayach
 Cheikhlar
 Daghleh
 Dahr El Qanbar
 Daoussa - Baghdadi
 Debbabiyeh
 Deir Jannine
 Dibbabiye
 Douair Aadouiyeh
 El Hedd
 El Qorne
 Ghazaleh
 Haouchab
 Haytla
 Kfar Harra
 Kherbet Char
 Khirbet Daoud
 Kouachra
 Machta Hassan
 Menjez
 Nahriyeh - Boustane El Herch
 Naoura
 Qarha
 Qochloq
 Qraiyat
 Rihaniyeh
 Rmah
 Sarar
 Sfinet Ed Drayb
 Sindianet Zeidan
 Tall Hmayra
 Tleil
 Wadi El Haour

References

Akkar divisions